Sukhvor-e Morovvati (also Romanized as Sūkhvor-e Morovvatī, Sūkhūr-e Morovvatī, and Sūkhvor Morovvatī) is a village in Heydariyeh Rural District, Govar District, Gilan-e Gharb County, Kermanshah Province, Iran. At the 2006 census, its population was 388, in 86 families.

References 

Populated places in Gilan-e Gharb County